Yōta, Yota or Youta is a masculine Japanese given name.

Possible writings
Yōta can be written using different combinations of kanji characters. Here are some examples:

洋太, "ocean, thick"
洋汰, "ocean, excessive"
洋多, "ocean, many"
陽太, "sunshine, thick"
陽汰, "sunshine, excessive"
陽多, "sunshine, many"
容太, "contain, thick"
容汰, "contain, excessive"
容多, "contain, many"
葉太, "leaf, thick"
葉汰, "leaf, excessive"
葉多, "leaf, many"
曜太, "weekday, thick"
曜汰, "weekday, excessive"
曜多, "weekday, many"
要太, "essential, thick"
瑶太, "precious stone, thick"
用汰, "utilize, excessive"
蓉太, "lotus, thick"
蓉多, "lotus, many"

The name can also be written in hiragana ようた or katakana ヨウタ.

Notable people with the name
, Japanese footballer
, Japanese swimmer
, Japanese footballer
, Japanese baseball player
, Japanese football player
, Japanese boxer
, Japanese footballer
, Japanese football player
, Japanese professional wrestler

Fictional characters
Yota Moteuchi (弄内 洋太), from anime and manga Video Girl Ai

Japanese masculine given names